Abdulaziz Al-Mutair (born 18 November 1992), is a Saudi Arabian football player who currently plays for Al-Ula as a forward.

References

External links
 

Living people
1992 births
Association football wingers
Saudi Arabian footballers
Al Hilal SFC players
Louletano D.C. players
Al-Qadsiah FC players
Al-Hazem F.C. players
Hajer FC players
Al-Jabalain FC players
Al-Thoqbah Club players
Al-Nahda Club (Saudi Arabia) players
Al-Arabi SC (Saudi Arabia) players
Al-Ula FC players
Place of birth missing (living people)
Saudi First Division League players
Saudi Professional League players
Saudi Third Division players
Expatriate footballers in Portugal
Saudi Arabian expatriate sportspeople in Portugal
Saudi Arabian expatriate footballers